A dictionary is a list of words and their meanings.

Dictionary may also refer to:
 Encyclopedic dictionary, sometimes titled Dictionary of...
 Biographical dictionary
 Dictionary (game), a word-definition party game

Computing
 Data dictionary, a centralised set of metadata in a database management system
 Dictionary (data structure), an abstract data type for a set of pairs
 Dictionary attack, a technique to determine a password
 Dictionary (software), an app in Mac OS X v10.4 and later
 Dictionary.com, a dictionary website

See also
 DICT
 Diction
 Lexicon (disambiguation)
 Wiktionary The official dictionary of the Wikimedia Foundation